Malcolm David Bolton (born 1946) is a British soil mechanics engineer and professor of geotechnical engineering at the University of Cambridge.

Education
He read engineering at the University of Cambridge. He then studied for a MSc at the University of Manchester Institute of Science and Technology (UMIST) and then did research in soil mechanics at Cambridge which led to the award of a PhD.

Career
He currently holds the Chair of Soil Mechanics at the University of Cambridge and his is the Director of the Schofield Centrifuge Centre for Geotechnical Processes and Construction. He published extensively  in the field of fundamental soil mechanics, geotechnical centrifuge testing and geotechnical design. For the latter topic, he introduced the mobilisable strength design (MSD) method. In 2012, he was invited to deliver the prestigious 52nd Rankine Lecture, titled "Performance-based design in geotechnical engineering". In 1991 he delivered the 2nd BGA Géotechnique Lecture.

References

External links
 Professor Malcolm D. Bolton's web page

British civil engineers
Fellows of Churchill College, Cambridge
Living people
Fellows of the Royal Academy of Engineering
Geotechnical engineers
Rankine Lecturers
1946 births